The President's Commission on Implementation of United States Space Exploration Policy was a Presidential Commission formed by United States President George W. Bush on January 27, 2004, through the . Its final report was submitted on June 4, 2004.

Commissioners
There were nine members of the commission:

Edward C. Aldridge Jr. - Chairman
Carly Fiorina
Michael P. Jackson
Laurie Leshin
Lester L. Lyles
Paul D. Spudis
Neil deGrasse Tyson
Robert S. Walker
Maria T. Zuber

Hearings
There were five public hearings held by the commission to gain a variety of different perspectives. They were as follows:
February 11, 2004 - National Transportation Safety Board, Washington, D.C.
March 3–4, 2004 - United States Air Force Museum, Wright-Patterson Air Force Base, Ohio
March 24–25, 2004 - Georgia Tech, Atlanta, Georgia
April 15–17, 2004 - Galileo Academy of Science and Technology, San Francisco, California
May 3–4, 2004 - Asia Society, New York City

Findings
The committee's findings and recommendations were:* 
 Space exploration must be a national priority
 NASA's relationship to the private sector must be transformed
 Key technologies must be developed
 A robust space industry is required
 International resources are valuable
 A space program can stimulate math, science, and engineering education

See also

Commission on the Future of the United States Aerospace Industry
U.S. National Space Policy

References

External links

NASA oversight
Implementation of United States Space Exploration Policy, President's Commission on
Reports of the United States government
Space policy of the United States
Presidency of George W. Bush